Orthetrum robustum is a freshwater dragonfly species, which occurs in Botswana, Namibia, South Africa and Zambia. The common name for this species is robust skimmer. It breeds inreedy swamps and woodland close to such swamps.

See also 
 Orthetrum

References 

Libellulidae
Insects described in 1965
Insects of Botswana
Insects of Namibia
Insects of South Africa
Insects of Zambia
Taxa named by Boris Balinsky